Obsession: Dark Desires is a true crime television series whose first episode aired on January 14, 2014.

The show dramatizes real life accounts from people who have been the victim of stalking.

Production 
The series was announced by the network Investigation Discovery (I.D.) in March 2013. It is an original production for British company October Films.

Jane Latman, senior VP of development at Investigation Discovery, said stalking was a very important issue and October Films series would “expertly profile the courage and tenacity of the victims to give viewers a visceral portrayal of survivors’ harrowing experiences.”

The series was produced by executive producer Jeanie Vink and producer Meghan Keener for Investigation Discovery and co-executive produced by Alex Sutherland, Steve Murphy, Matt Robins and Denman Rooke for October Films. The series was directed by Tom Keeling, Jim Greayer, Jamie Crawford and Fergus Colville.

In April 2013, Cineflix announced that it had signed a two-year first-look deal to all of production company October Films new programming, which includes Obsession: Dark Desires.

The series debuted on the Investigation Discovery network on January 14, 2014. Shortly afterwards, it was picked up by the Crime and Investigation Network for transmission in the UK.

After a two-year hiatus, the series returned to Investigation Discovery for a fifth season in December of 2019.

Episodes

Season 1 (2014)

Season 2 (2015)

Season 3 (2016)

Season 4 (2017)

Season 5 (2019–20)

References

External links 
 Press release

2014 American television series debuts
Investigation Discovery original programming
True crime television series
2020 American television series endings
Works about stalking